Kamini Jain (born 13 November 1969) is a Canadian sprint kayaker who competed in the early to mid-2000s. Competing in two Summer Olympics, she earned her best finish of eighth in the K-4 500 m event at Athens in 2004.

References
Sports-Reference.com profile

1969 births
Canadian female canoeists
Canoeists at the 2000 Summer Olympics
Canoeists at the 2004 Summer Olympics
Living people
Olympic canoeists of Canada
People from Tripoli, Libya
Simon Fraser University alumni